Santa Ana Pueblo (Eastern Keres: Tamaya [tʰɑmɑjːɑ]) is a census-designated place (CDP) in Sandoval County, New Mexico, United States. As of the 2000 census, the CDP had a total population of 479. It is part of the Albuquerque Metropolitan Statistical Area. The Pueblo, named Tamaya in Keres, administers a total reservation land of 73,000 acres (295 km2) in the Rio Grande valley and is composed of Native Americans who speak an eastern dialect of the Keresan languages.

The pueblo celebrates an annual feast day for its patron saint, St. Anne, on July 26.

Geography 
According to the United States Census Bureau, the CDP has a total area of 7.4 square miles (19.3 km2), of which 6.9 square miles (17.9 km2) is land and 0.5 square mile (1.4 km2) (7.11%) is water.

Demographics 

As of the census of 2000, there were 479 people, 121 households, and 99 families residing in the CDP. The population density was 69.2 people per square mile (26.7/km2). There were 132 housing units at an average density of 19.1 per square mile (7.4/km2). The racial makeup of the CDP was 1.25% White, 97.29% Native American, 0.84% from other races, and 0.63% from two or more races. 2.51% of the population were Hispanic or Latino of any race.

There were 121 households, out of which 43.0% had children under the age of 18 living with them, 41.3% were married couples living together, 31.4% had a female householder with no husband present, and 17.4% were non-families. 14.9% of all households were made up of individuals, and 5.0% had someone living alone who was 65 years of age or older. The average household size was 3.96 and the average family size was 4.42.

In the CDP, the population was spread out, with 34.9% under the age of 18, 11.5% from 18 to 24, 26.7% from 25 to 44, 17.7% from 45 to 64, and 9.2% who were 65 years of age or older. The median age was 28 years. For every 100 females, there were 88.6 males. For every 100 females age 18 and over, there were 73.3 males.

The median income for a household in the CDP was $45,179, and the median income for a family was $45,714. Males had a median income of $22,188 versus $23,125 for females. The per capita income for the CDP was $9,857. 5.1% of the population and 4.1% of families were below the poverty line, including 4.1% of those under the age of 18 and 5.3% of those 65 and older.

Economy
The people of Santa Ana Pueblo participate in a mixed economy, with many travelling to jobs outside of the Pueblo lands.

The Pueblo operates the Santa Ana Star Casino and is the site of the Hyatt Regency Tamaya Resort & Spa. The Pueblo owns and operates two championship golf courses, Santa Ana Golf Club and Twin Warriors Golf Club. They also run arts & crafts, gardening and cooking enterprises.

In 2022, Tesla leased Santa Ana tribal land to build a new service and delivery center, something that they cannot do on non-Federal-jurisdiction land in the state due to New Mexico legislation requiring the use of automobile dealers as intermediaries in selling cars to consumers, something Tesla has been unwilling to do. The store is expected to open in May 2023 and will be five times larger than the first New Mexico Tesla facility on tribal land, a  service center built the previous year in Nambe.

Education
Most of Santa Ana Pueblo is in the Bernalillo Public Schools district. Some is in the Jemez Valley Public Schools district. The former operates Bernalillo Middle School (the zoned middle school of the Bernalillo portion of this community), and Bernalillo High School.

References

External links
 Official Santa Ana Pueblo website
 My New Mexico Golf website

Census-designated places in Sandoval County, New Mexico
Census-designated places in New Mexico
Native American tribes in New Mexico
Albuquerque metropolitan area